Brick Renaissance is the Northern European continuation of brick architecture after Brick Romanesque and Brick Gothic. Although the term Brick Gothic is often used generally for all of this architecture, especially in regard to the Hanseatic cities of the Baltic, the stylistic changes that led to the end of Gothic architecture did reach Northern Germany and northern Europe with delay, leading to the adoption of Renaissance elements into brick building. Nonetheless, it is very difficult for non-experts to distinguish transitional phases or early Brick Renaissance, as the style maintained many typical features of Brick Gothic, such as stepped gables. A clearer distinction only developed at the transition to Baroque architecture. In Lübeck, for example, Brick Renaissance is clearly recognisable in buildings equipped with terracotta reliefs by the artist Statius von Düren, who was also active at Schwerin (Schwerin Castle) and Wismar (Fürstenhof).

More clearly recognisable as Renaissance are brick buildings strongly influenced by the Dutch Renaissance style, such as Reinbek Castle at Reinbek near Hamburg, the Zeughaus at Lübeck, or Friedrichstadt in Schleswig-Holstein.

Belarus

Denmark

Germany

Italy

Lithuania

Poland

Sweden

References

B01
.
Brick
Renaissance Brick